Ivan Michael Wingreen (23 June 1961 – 11 May 2014) was a South African cricketer.  Born in Cape Town, Cape Province he played first-class cricket for Western Province in a career that lasted from 1983 to 1987.

Wingreen played 22 first-class matches for Western Province B. His highest score was 103 against Eastern Province B in 1985-86. He also played three List A cricket matches in 1984-85, two for Western Province, one for Western Province B.

Personal life
Wingreen was married and had two daughters.  He died after an illness in Australia.  He had been living there for several years and had been suffering from a brain tumor.

References

South African cricketers
Cricketers from Cape Town
Western Province cricketers
1961 births
2014 deaths
South African emigrants to Australia